was a Japanese singer. His recording career spanned nearly the entire Shōwa era.

Life and career
Dick Mine was born  on October 8, 1908, in the city of Tokushima. Mine's father, Enjurō Mine, had taught at Tokyo Imperial University and was the first ever principal at Tosa High School; his maternal grandfather had been a priest at the Nikkō Tōshō-gū.

Mine became interested in Western music by listening to his mother's record collection. His interest developed quickly and by his late teens was singing part-time—under the stage name Kōichi Mine—in jazz bands and dance halls while a student at Rikkyo University. He also learned to play the steel guitar, a comparatively rare talent at the time in Japan, which gained him session work for Nippon Columbia backing well-known singers such as Miss Columbia among others.

After graduating, a recommendation from his father led to a bank clerk job. The young Mine, however, abandoned the banking profession determined to make a career in music.

It was working as a singer and drummer with Noriko Awaya's backing orchestra on the dance hall circuit that Mine began to win fame. He was later approached by Teichiku Records with a record contract, resulting in the beginning of his recorded singing career and the founding of his own band. Among the band's personnel was the California-born Nisei, Betty Inada.

On August 7, 1934, the band cut their first record. That was followed up shortly thereafter with a cover of Dinah, which had been suggested to Mine by Teichiku's house composer, Masao Koga. Their cover—the first record employing Mine's new stage name, Dick Mine—became a smash hit and the song would be identified with Mine for the rest of his life.

In the late 1930s, Mine was signed up by Nikkatsu Studios and played supporting roles in a number of films, including Singing Lovebirds directed by Masahiro Makino.

In 1941, under pressure from anti-Western Japanese censors, Mine reverted to using Kōichi Mine as a stage name. After the Pacific War broke out, Mine divided his career between Japan and Shanghai.

Mine picked up his career after the war, continuing with successes in music and film.

In the 1960s he became a prominent anti-nuclear activist.

In 1982, he enjoyed his last hit—a duet with Noriko Awaya called Modern Age.

Death
Mine died from heart failure on June 10, 1991. He is buried in the Tama Cemetery in Tokyo.

Select discography

  1934 as Dick Mine and his Serenaders (credited as translator and lyricist under Koichi Mine); 1940 with A. L. King and his Florida Serenaders
  (lit. Young Girl of Ireland) 1935
  1935
  1936
  1936
  1939
  1939
  1939
  (lit. Mandarin Duck Song Contest) 1939
  1939
  1940
  1941
  (with Noriko Awaya) 1982

References

External links
Dick Mine at Find a Grave

People from Tokushima (city)
Japanese jazz singers
Rikkyo University alumni
1908 births
1991 deaths
Musicians from Tokushima Prefecture
20th-century Japanese male singers
20th-century Japanese singers
Male jazz musicians
Crooners